Shane Dru Swanson is a former gridiron football player who played briefly for the Denver Broncos in 1987. He played three seasons of college football at Nebraska as a return specialist, running back, and wide receiver. Though used sparingly at all three positions, he is remembered for a go-ahead 49 yard punt return touchdown in the fourth quarter to help #8 Nebraska defeat #9 Oklahoma State on Oct 6, 1984. Swanson was drafted by the Cleveland Browns in 1985, but didn't appear in an NFL game until 1987; his entire career consisted of replacing an injured Ken Bell in games 3, 4, and 5 of the Broncos 1987 season. In the last of these games, he had 6 receptions for 87 yards (including a go-ahead 35 yard touchdown), 6 punt returns for 112 yards, and 3 kickoff returns for 91 yards. , 290 all-purpose yards remains a Broncos rookie record.

References

1962 births
Living people
Cleveland Browns players
Denver Broncos players
University of Nebraska alumni
National Football League replacement players